Melitoxoides is a genus of moths in the family Gelechiidae.

Species
 Melitoxoides cophias (Meyrick, 1913)
 Melitoxoides leucodoxa (Meyrick, 1920)

Former species
 Melitoxoides eusebasta
 Melitoxoides glauca
 Melitoxoides panaula

References

Gelechiinae